The ICC Women's Championship (IWC) is an international cricket tournament used to determine qualification for the Women's Cricket World Cup. The first two tournaments were contested between the top eight teams of the ICC Women's Rankings. The first edition was the 2014–16 ICC Women's Championship, which started in April 2014 and was concluded in November 2016. Australia were the winners of the inaugural tournament. The second edition of the tournament started in October 2017, with the top four teams automatically qualifying for the 2021 Women's Cricket World Cup.

In September 2018, the International Cricket Council (ICC) announced that they were exploring the option to expand the IWC to all ten teams, therefore including Bangladesh and Ireland in future editions of the competition. In August 2021, the ICC confirmed that the three qualifiers from the 2021 Women's Cricket World Cup Qualifier tournament and the next two best placed teams would qualify for the next IWC cycle. However, in November 2021, the qualifier tournament was called off midway through, due to the discovery of a new variant of COVID-19 in Southern Africa. Therefore, Bangladesh and Ireland joined the IWC for the 2022–25 cycle, based on their ODI rankings.

Tournament history

Season

Team

References

 
ICC Women's Championship
Recurring sporting events established in 2014
International Cricket Council events
Women's One Day International cricket competitions